Cotinusa is a genus of jumping spiders that was first described by Eugène Louis Simon in 1900.

Species
 it contains thirty-one species, found in South America, Pakistan, Mexico, and Panama:
Cotinusa adelae Mello-Leitão, 1944 – Argentina
Cotinusa albescens Mello-Leitão, 1945 – Argentina
Cotinusa bisetosa Simon, 1900 – Venezuela
Cotinusa bryantae Chickering, 1946 – Panama
Cotinusa cancellata (Mello-Leitão, 1943) – Brazil
Cotinusa deserta (Peckham & Peckham, 1894) – Brazil
Cotinusa dimidiata Simon, 1900 – Peru
Cotinusa distincta (Peckham & Peckham, 1888) (type) – Mexico to Peru
Cotinusa fenestrata (Taczanowski, 1878) – Peru
Cotinusa furcifera (Schenkel, 1953) – Venezuela
Cotinusa gemmea (Peckham & Peckham, 1894) – Brazil
Cotinusa gertschi (Mello-Leitão, 1947) – Brazil
Cotinusa horatia (Peckham & Peckham, 1894) – Brazil, Argentina
Cotinusa irregularis (Mello-Leitão, 1945) – Argentina
Cotinusa leucoprocta (Mello-Leitão, 1947) – Brazil
Cotinusa magna (Peckham & Peckham, 1894) – Brazil, Argentina
Cotinusa mathematica (Mello-Leitão, 1917) – Brazil
Cotinusa melanura Mello-Leitão, 1939 – Paraguay
Cotinusa puella Simon, 1900 – Brazil
Cotinusa pulchra Mello-Leitão, 1917 – Brazil
Cotinusa rosascostai Mello-Leitão, 1944 – Argentina
Cotinusa rubriceps (Mello-Leitão, 1947) – Brazil
Cotinusa septempunctata Simon, 1900 – Venezuela
Cotinusa setosa (Mello-Leitão, 1947) – Brazil
Cotinusa simoni Chickering, 1946 – Panama
Cotinusa soesilae Makhan, 2009 – Suriname
Cotinusa splendida (Dyal, 1935) – Pakistan
Cotinusa stolzmanni (Taczanowski, 1878) – Peru
Cotinusa trifasciata (Mello-Leitão, 1943) – Brazil, Argentina
Cotinusa trimaculata Mello-Leitão, 1922 – Brazil
Cotinusa vittata Simon, 1900 – Brazil, Argentina

References

External links
 Photographs of Cotinusa species from Brazil

Salticidae
Salticidae genera
Spiders of Asia
Spiders of Central America
Spiders of South America